The Country Girl is a 1954 American drama film written and directed by George Seaton and starring Bing Crosby, Grace Kelly, and William Holden. Adapted by Seaton from Clifford Odets' 1950 play of the same name, the film is about an alcoholic has-been actor/singer struggling with the one last chance he has been given to resurrect his career. Seaton won the Academy Award for Best Writing, Adapted Screenplay. It was entered in the 1955 Cannes Film Festival.

Kelly won the Academy Award for Best Actress for her role, which previously had earned Uta Hagen her first Tony Award in the play's original Broadway production.  The role, a non-glamorous departure for Kelly, was as the alcoholic actor's long-suffering wife.

Plot
In a theatre, auditions are being held for a new musical production titled The Land Around Us. Director Bernie Dodd watches a number performed by fading star Frank Elgin and suggests that he be cast in the leading role. This is met with strong opposition from Philip Cook, the show's producer.

However, Bernie insists on the down-on-his-luck Frank, who is living in a modest apartment with his wife Georgie. They are grateful for the opportunity, though not entirely certain Frank can handle the work.

Initially Frank leads Bernie to believe that Georgie is the reason for the decline in his career. Bernie strongly criticizes her, first behind her back and eventually to her face. What he does not know is that the real reason why Frank's career has ended is his insecurity. When their five-year-old son Johnny was hit by a car and died while in Frank's care, he was devastated. Partly using that as an excuse to cover up his insecurity, Frank has been reduced to a suicidal alcoholic.

Mealy-mouthed to the director's face, Frank is actually a demanding alcoholic who is completely dependent on his wife. Bernie mistakenly blames her for everything that happens during rehearsals, including Elgin's requests for a dresser and a run-of-the-show contract. He believes Georgie to be suicidal and a drunk, when it is actually Frank who is both.

Humiliated when he learns the truth, Bernie realizes that behind his hatred of Georgie was a strong attraction to her. His anger melts away and he kisses her. She tells him that it does not mean that anything has changed.

Elgin's performance is a success on opening night. Afterward, he demands respect from Cook, which he and his wife had not been given before the opening. Previously Georgie had said that if only Frank could stand on his own two feet, she could get away from him. At a party to celebrate the play's opening, Bernie believes Georgie will be free to leave Frank, and tells her that he loves her. Later Frank tells them he has noticed their longing looks, and all three talk. Shortly after, Frank leaves the party. Georgie says goodbye to Bernie, and he tells her he appreciates a woman who is loyal. She kisses him lightly and goes to catch up with Frank.

Cast

Reception
Filmed between February and April 1954, the film had its benefit world premiere at Criterion Theatre, New York on December 15, 1954. The Gala West Coast Premiere took place at the Stanley Warner Theatre, Wilshire Blvd. at Canon Drive, Beverly Hills, on December 21. This was a benefit for the United States Olympic Fund. The critical response was very favorable with Bosley Crowther of The New York Times writing, "The Country Girl comes along fitly as one of the fine and forceful pictures of the year." Variety summed it up with "[a]n exceptionally well performed essay on an alcoholic song man, with Bing Crosby the one carrying on a bottle romance, Country Girl is high on boxoffice punch. It's a strong, intense show that's certain to be talked about."

Awards and nominations

Soundtrack
All the songs were written by Harold Arlen (music) and Ira Gershwin (lyrics).

 "It's Mine, It's Yours" sung by Bing Crosby
 "The Search Is Through" sung by Bing Crosby
 "The Land Around Us" sung by Bing Crosby
 "Dissertation on the State of Bliss" sung by Jacqueline Fontaine and Bing Crosby

Bing Crosby recorded four of the songs for Decca Records and these were issued on a 10-inch LP titled The Country Girl / Little Boy Lost. Crosby's songs were also included in the Bing's Hollywood series.

In popular culture
Some of the dialogue from the film was used in the 2007 Mika song "Grace Kelly". The film is referenced by name in the television series I Love Lucy in the 1955 episode "L.A. at Last" by William Holden who guest-starred in the episode.

References

External links

 
 
 
 
 

1954 films
1954 drama films
1950s English-language films
1950s musical drama films
American black-and-white films
American films based on plays
American musical drama films
Films about actors
Films about alcoholism
Films about grieving
Films about marriage
Films about musical theatre
Films based on works by Clifford Odets
Films directed by George Seaton
Films featuring a Best Actress Academy Award-winning performance
Films featuring a Best Drama Actress Golden Globe-winning performance
Films produced by William Perlberg
Films scored by Victor Young
Films set in Boston
Films set in New York City
Films whose writer won the Best Adapted Screenplay Academy Award
Paramount Pictures films
1950s American films